Amicus Productions was a British film production company, based at Shepperton Studios, England, active between 1962 and 1977. It was founded by American producers and screenwriters Milton Subotsky and Max Rosenberg.

Films 

Prior to establishing Amicus, its two producers collaborated on the successful horror film The City of the Dead (1960).  Amicus's first two films were low-budget musicals for the teenage market, It's Trad, Dad! (1962) and Just for Fun (1963).  Amicus is best remembered for making a series of portmanteau horror anthologies, inspired by the Ealing Studios film Dead of Night (1945). They also made some straight thriller films, often based on a gimmick.

Amicus's horror and thriller films are sometimes mistaken for the output of the better-known Hammer Film Productions, due to the two companies' similar visual style and use of some of the same actors, including Peter Cushing and Christopher Lee. Unlike the period gothic Hammer films, Amicus productions were usually set in the present day.

Although not an Amicus Productions film, a film version of Harold Pinter's play The Birthday Party (1968), directed by William Friedkin, was produced by the team of Subotsky and Rosenberg for Palomar Pictures International

Portmanteau horror films 

Amicus's portmanteau films included Dr. Terror's House of Horrors (1965), directed by Freddie Francis, Torture Garden (1967), The House That Dripped Blood (1971), Tales from the Crypt (1972), Asylum (1972), Vault of Horror (1973) and From Beyond the Grave (1974). These films typically feature four or sometimes five short horror stories, linked by an overarching plot featuring a narrator and those listening to his story.

The casts of these films are invariably composed of name actors, each of whom play a main part in one of the stories—-a small proportion of the film as a whole. Along with genre stars like Cushing, Lee and Herbert Lom, Amicus also drew its actors from the classical British stage (Patrick Magee, Margaret Leighton and Ralph Richardson), rising younger actors (Donald Sutherland, Robert Powell and Tom Baker), or former stars in decline (Richard Greene, Robert Hutton, and Terry-Thomas). Some, such as Joan Collins, were in their mid-career doldrums when they worked with Amicus, while others such as Jon Pertwee and Tom Baker (later the third and fourth incarnations of the Doctor in the science-fiction series, Doctor Who) were at the height of their careers.

Torture Garden, Asylum and The House That Dripped Blood were written by Robert Bloch, based upon his own stories. An exception was the "Waxworks" segment of The House That Dripped Blood, which was scripted (uncredited) by Russ Jones, based on Bloch's story. Tales from the Crypt and The Vault of Horror were based on stories from EC horror comics from the 1950s.

Other horror films

Amicus also produced some conventional chillers, such as The Skull (1965), The Psychopath (1966), I, Monster (1971), And Now the Screaming Starts! (1973), and The Beast Must Die (1974). The Skull was also based on a Bloch story (though scripted by Milton Subotsky). Bloch was also the screenwriter of Amicus's thriller The Psychopath (1966), and wrote the original adaptation of The Deadly Bees (based upon H. F. Heard's A Taste for Honey).

Science fiction, espionage, drama

In the mid-1960s, Amicus also produced two films based on the science fiction television series Doctor Who which had debuted on television in 1963. The films, Dr. Who and the Daleks (1965) and Daleks' Invasion Earth 2150 A.D. (1966), are the only theatrical film adaptations of the series. In these films, Peter Cushing played "Dr. Who", a human scientist rather than an alien, with Who as his actual surname, disregarding the backstory of the TV series.

Amicus also funded and produced films of other genres. Danger Route (1967) was a film version of Christopher Nicole's (writing as Andrew York) 1966 spy novel The Eliminator, directed by Seth Holt, the only film of the Jonas Wilde series of novels to have been filmed. 

Margaret Drabble's adaptation of her novel The Millstone (1965) was filmed as A Touch of Love (1969), and Laurence Moody's novel The Ruthless Ones (1969) was filmed as What Became of Jack and Jill? (1972)

Amicus Productions produced a few science fiction films, including a 1967 double bill of The Terrornauts and They Came from Beyond Space that were produced when Joseph E. Levine, who Rosenberg had previously worked with, told Rosenberg that if Amicus could produce two films for £200,000, Embassy Pictures would finance and release both of them. 

Amicus later produced a trilogy of adaptations of several of the works of Edgar Rice Burroughs, including The Land That Time Forgot (1975), At the Earth's Core (1976), and The People That Time Forgot (1977).

After Amicus
Milton Subotsky relocated to Canada for a time and unsuccessfully tried to carry on the anthology convention with such films as The Uncanny (1977) and The Monster Club (1981); Peter Cushing came along for the former but passed on the latter. Subotsky secured the rights to some Stephen King properties in the early 1980s and got a credit on the King anthology film Cat's Eye (1985). His final credits, again based on King properties, would be Sometimes They Come Back (1991), The Lawnmower Man (1992), and Sometimes They Come Back... Again (1996), the last title bearing Subotsky's final credit; he had died in 1991.

Today 

In 2003, Anchor Bay Entertainment released a five disc DVD box-set of Amicus films in a coffin-shaped container in the UK. In 2005, Amicus was revived to produce homages to the old titles as well as original horror fare. Their first production was Stuart Gordon's Stuck (2007).

Filmography

 It's Trad, Dad! (1962)
 Just for Fun (1963)
 Dr. Terror's House of Horrors (1965)
 Dr. Who and the Daleks (1965)
 The Skull (1965)
 The Psychopath (1966)
 The Deadly Bees (1966)
 Daleks' Invasion Earth 2150 A.D. (1966)
 The Terrornauts (1967)
 They Came from Beyond Space (1967)
 Torture Garden (1967)
 Danger Route (1967)
 A Touch of Love (1969)
 Scream and Scream Again (1970)
 The Mind of Mr. Soames (1970)
 The House That Dripped Blood (1971)
 I, Monster (1971)
 Tales from the Crypt (1972)
 What Became of Jack and Jill? (1972)
 Asylum (1972)
 The Vault of Horror (1973)
 And Now the Screaming Starts! (1973)
 From Beyond the Grave (1974)
 The Beast Must Die (1974)
 Madhouse (1974)
 The Land That Time Forgot (1974)
 At the Earth's Core (1976)
 The People That Time Forgot (1977)

References

Notes

Further reading 

  Liskeard: Stray Cat, 2000  163 pp.
  Bristol: Hemlock Books, 2014  239 pp.

External links 

 Amicus Horror Films List

Film production companies of the United Kingdom